Mourad El Mabrouk (born 19 October 1986) is a Tunisian professional basketball player who currently plays for Jalaa of the Syrian Basketball League (SBL).

Professional career
El Mabrouk has played with Club Africain in the Tunisian League. In May 2021, he joined US Monastir to play in the inaugural season of the Basketball Africa League (BAL). He was a starter for Monastir as the team went on to play in the 2021 BAL Finals, where they lost to Zamalek. El Mabrouk averaged 6 points and 2.5 assists game.

On May 6, 2022, El Mabrouk signed with Jalaa of the Syrian Basketball League ahead of the Final Four stage.

Tunisian national team
El Mabrouk has played with the senior men's Tunisian national basketball team. He competed at the 2012 Summer Olympics.

BAL career statistics

|-
|style="text-align:left;"|2021
|style="text-align:left;"|Monastir
| 6 || 6 || 23.7 || .286 || .303 || 1.000 || 2.3 || 2.5 || 1.0 || 0.3 || 6.0
|- class="sortbottom"
| style="text-align:center;" colspan="2"|Career
| 6 || 6 || 23.7 || .286 || .303 || 1.000 || 2.3 || 2.5 || 1.0 || 0.3 || 6.0

References

External links

1986 births
Living people
Tunisian men's basketball players
Olympic basketball players of Tunisia
Basketball players at the 2012 Summer Olympics
Ezzahra Sports players
Club Africain basketball players
Sportspeople from Tunis
Mediterranean Games bronze medalists for Tunisia
Mediterranean Games medalists in basketball
Competitors at the 2013 Mediterranean Games
2019 FIBA Basketball World Cup players
Tunisian expatriate basketball people in France
Shooting guards
US Monastir basketball players
Hermine Nantes Basket players
21st-century Tunisian people